Without Children, also known as Penthouse Party, is a 1935 American drama film directed by William Nigh and starring Marguerite Churchill, Bruce Cabot and Evelyn Brent.

Cast
 Marguerite Churchill as Sue Cole  
 Bruce Cabot as David F. Cole  
 Evelyn Brent as Shirley Ross Cole  
 Reginald Denny as Phil Graham  
 Dorothy Lee as Carol Cole  
 William Janney as David Sonny Cole Jr.  
 Dickie Moore as David Sonny Cole Jr. as a Child  
 Cora Sue Collins as Carol Cole as a Child  
 Lillian Harmer as Frieda  
 Joan Woodbury as Secretary

References

Bibliography
 Pitts, Michael R. Poverty Row Studios, 1929–1940: An Illustrated History of 55 Independent Film Companies, with a Filmography for Each. McFarland & Company, 2005.

External links
 

1935 films
1935 drama films
1930s English-language films
American drama films
Films directed by William Nigh
American black-and-white films
1930s American films